The first season of the Reborn! anime series is a compilation of the first thirty-three episodes from the series, which first aired in Japan from October 7, 2006 to May 26, 2007 on TV Tokyo. Titled as Katekyō Hitman Reborn! in Japan, the Japanese television series was directed by Kenichi Imaizumi, and produced and animated by Artland. The plot, based on the Reborn! manga by Akira Amano, centers around the life of Tsunayoshi "Tsuna" Sawada, a timid boy who learns he is the great-great-great grandson of the founder of the Italian Vongola mafia family. Tsuna, who is the only living heir, must learn to become a proper Mafia boss and is required to undergo training from the Vongola's number one hitman, an infant named Reborn. 

Five pieces of theme music are used for the episodes: two opening themes and three ending themes. The first opening theme, which is used for the first twenty-six episodes, is "Drawing days" by SPLAY. It is followed by LM.C's "Boys and Girls", used for the following episodes. The first ending theme is "Michishirube" by Keita Tachibana, which is used for the first twelve episodes, followed by the Arrows' "One Night Star" from episodes thirteen to twenty-nine, then Splay's "Echo Again" for the remainder of the season.

Marvelous Entertainment, the Japanese company that handles the DVD distribution of the series, released the volumes of this season with the name "Bullet". Each of them contain four episodes with the exception of Bullet.8 which contains five episodes. The first volume was released on January 26, 2007, while the eighth was released on August 31, 2007. A DVD box containing the Bullet episodes was published in Japan on June 17, 2009.

On March 21, 2009, Japan's d-rights production company collaborated with the anime-streaming website called Crunchyroll in order to begin streaming subbed episodes of the Japanese-dubbed series worldwide. New episodes are available to everyone a week after its airing in Japan.


Episode list

References 
General
 
 
 
Specific

External links 
Official Reborn! website 
Official anime website 
TV Tokyo's official anime website 

2006 Japanese television seasons
2007 Japanese television seasons
Season 1